Edgy may refer to:

 An alternate name for Edge (video game)
 Edgy Lee, filmmaker
 Edgy (programming language), an extension of Snap! (programming language) supporting graph algorithms
 Edgy Eft, an Ubuntu operating system release
 Edgy in Brixton, a DVD
 Edgy Women, a feminist performance festival 1994 - 2016